Tana River County is a county in the former Coast Province of Kenya. It is named after the Tana River, the longest river in Kenya. The county borders Kitui County to the west, Garissa County to the northeast, Isiolo County to the north, Lamu County to the southeast and Kilifi County to the south. The capital and largest town is Hola (also known as Galole).

Apart from the River Tana, there are several seasonal rivers in the county popularly known as lagas, which flow in a west–east direction from Kitui and Makueni Counties, draining into the River Tana and eventually into the Indian Ocean.

District subdivisions
Despite the large area of the Tana River district, its only local authority is Tana River County Council. The district has three constituencies: Garsen, Galole and Bura,15 wards, 54 locations, and one hundred nine (109) sub-Locations .

Religion 

The county consists of 81% Muslims, 18% Christians and 1% of people in other religions (including Atheism).

Population

The major ethnic groups are the Somalis, of which the Wardey are the largest clan. The minority groups are the Pokomo (many of whom are farmers), and the Orma people. The county is generally dry and prone to drought. Rainfall is erratic, with rainy seasons in March–May and October–December. Conflicts have occurred between farmers and other people over access to water. Flooding is also a regular problem, caused by heavy rainfall in upstream areas of the Tana River.

A recent survey prepared by ALMRP, Tana River District presented to the Tana River District Steering Group (2004) found that the county is 79% food insecure and with an incidence of poverty at 62% (Interim Poverty Strategy Paper (I-PSP), 2000–2003, Kenya).

2012 ethnic violence

On 22 August 2012, in the worst violent incident in Kenya since 2007, at least 52 people were killed in ethnic violence in Tana River County between the Orma and Pokomo groups.

Villages and settlements

 Ariti
 Balguda
 Baomo
 Baomo
 Borobini
 Bohoni
 Bongonoko
Chathoro
 Chewani
 Chiffiri
 Laini
 Ijara
 Fitina
 Furaha
 Handarako
 Idsowe
 Ingile
 Irangi
 Wacha Kone
 Wenje
 Maziwa

Bura Irrigation and Settlement Project is located in Tana River County. During the years 1981-1988 about 2,200 families from different parts of Kenya were settled in this irrigation scheme.

Tana River County consists of forest, woodland and grassland which are minor centers of endemism. The forests are designated National Reserve status if they have >4 plant endemics and >7 vertebrate endemics (IUCN, 2003). Despite the apparent adequate natural resources, the region remains marginalized from the rest of the country. Efforts at development always seem to center on the huge River Tana, despite massive failures in all the previous irrigation projects in the district, i.e. Bura, Hola and the Tana delta rice irrigation project which failed after the water works were damaged by the El Niño rains in 1998. .Other economic activities in Tana River county include mining with gems such as Iron ore, Uranium, Gypsum, Barite and illmenite .

See also
 2014 Lamu attacks

References

External links
Office for the Coordination of Humanitarian Affairs – Kenya AdminLevels 1-4
Tana River District: a showcase of conflict over natural resources at ITDG
Map of the District
Bura Irrigation and Settlement Project
http://www.mambolook.com/tana-river

 
Counties of Kenya
Tana River (Kenya)